The Elmbrook Schools or School District of Elmbrook is headquartered in Brookfield, Wisconsin. It serves Brookfield, Elm Grove, and a small portion of New Berlin.

History
The voters of the Elmbrook School District approved by referendum a $62.2 million project to remodel both district high schools. The vote held on April 1, 2008 passed with a 52% majority.

Board of education
The Elmbrook Board of Education consists of seven members, four representing districts, and three elected at large.

Schools
Elementary schools:
 Brookfield Elementary School (Brookfield)
 Burleigh Elementary School (Brookfield)
 Dixon Elementary School (Brookfield)
 Swanson Elementary School (Brookfield)
 Tonawanda Elementary School (Elm Grove)

Middle schools:
 Wisconsin Hills Middle School (Brookfield)
 Pilgrim Park Middle School (Elm Grove)

High schools:
 Brookfield Central High School (Brookfield)
 Brookfield East High School (Brookfield)

Special education:
 Fairview South School (WCSEC) (Brookfield)

Closed schools:
 Hillside Elementary (Brookfield) (closed in 2012)

References

External links
 Elmbrook Schools

School districts in Wisconsin
Education in Waukesha County, Wisconsin